Gol Tappeh is a village in Zarrineh Rud Rural District, Bizineh Rud District, Khodabandeh County, Zanjan Province, Iran. At the 2006 census, its population was 811, in 184 families.

References 

Populated places in Khodabandeh County